Luisa Fernanda is a romantic zarzuela in three acts by Federico Moreno Torroba. It has been performed more than 10,000 times. The Spanish-language libretto is by Federico Romero and Guillermo Fernández-Shaw. It was Moreno Torroba’s fourth zarzuela, his first to receive great acclaim.

Roles

Selected recordings

References

External links 
 
 Luisa Fernanda synopsis.
 

Operas by Federico Moreno Torroba
Spanish-language operas
1932 operas
Zarzuelas
Operas